Bandila is a Philippine television late-night news program broadcast by ABS-CBN with simulcast worldwide via TFC, Originally anchored by Korina Sanchez, Henry Omaga-Diaz and Ces Oreña-Drilon. The program premiered on July 3, 2006, and most recently aired weeknights from 10:50PM to 11:20PM before it was suspended on March 17, 2020 and eventually cancelled after the National Telecommunications Commission ordered the shutdown of ABS-CBN, with Julius Babao and Karen Davila as the final anchors.

History
Bandila debuted on July 3, 2006 replacing ABS-CBN Insider, with Korina Sanchez, Henry Omaga-Diaz and Ces Oreña-Drilon as its original anchors. It was the competitor of GMA Network's Saksi.

On May 8, 2009, Sanchez took an indefinite leave and eventually left the newscast for good, leaving Omaga-Diaz and Drilon as the anchors.

On November 3, 2010, ABS-CBN announced the appointment of outgoing TV Patrol anchors Julius Babao and Karen Davila to Bandila. Their arrival to the late-night newscast was scheduled to November 8, but was postponed when Babao was on a vacation at that time. They finally arrived to the newscast on November 22, replacing Omaga-Diaz who decided to return to field reporting.

On April 25, 2011, Bandila launched its official webpage as its additional online citizen journalism site.

On October 3, 2011, Bandila moved to an earlier timeslot with the addition of Boy Abunda as one of the anchors, upon which it focuses on entertainment, hosting the segment Ikaw Na!, where Abunda interviews showbiz personalities. Abunda left the newscast on February 7, 2014 to host Aquino & Abunda Tonight, a new nightly talk show with Kris Aquino that would air right before Bandila.

On April 17, 2017, Bandila returned to DZMM and DZMM TeleRadyo after six years. Unlike the previous iteration which was a slightly delayed simulcast of the show that aired on the main ABS-CBN network, Bandila had a separate and standalone edition for DZMM and DZMM TeleRadyo and aired at 10:00 PM. The DZMM version ended again on May 20, 2019.

On December 21, 2017, Ces Oreña-Drilon announced that she would be leaving Bandila to focus on her new position in the network as "lifestyle content head".

On April 2, 2018, Bandila (along with the other news programs of ABS-CBN) has finally switched to high definition (1080i, 16:9 HDTV) format.

On March 17, 2020, Bandila's production was suspended due to the enhanced community quarantine implemented to manage the COVID-19 pandemic in the Philippines. Its timeslot was replaced by replays of TV Patrol. Furthermore, with the network shutting down operations due to the expiration of its legislative franchise and in compliance with the NTC's cease and desist order, the current status of the newscast remained unknown until it was eventually cancelled.

Instead, ABS-CBN's former and ANC's current English late-night newscast, The World Tonight, was aired on the network's replacement channel, Kapamilya Channel on July 27, 2020 marking its return to original network for last 21 years. A2Z, the ad interim replacement for ABS-CBN Channel 2, launched Balitang A2Z as its replacement for the late-night news program on July 26, 2021.

Anchors

Korina Sanchez (2006–2009)
Henry Omaga-Diaz (2006–2010)
Ces Oreña-Drilon (main anchor, 2006–2017)
Julius Babao (2010–2020)
Karen Davila (2010–2020)
Boy Abunda (2011–2014; Ikaw Na! anchor)
Tony Velasquez (2014–2016; Tatak Noypi anchor)

International broadcast
Bandila aired worldwide (with roughly one-day delay) on The Filipino Channel (TFC) in Asia Pacific, Australia, Canada, Europe, Middle East, and the United States.

In Australia, SBS first aired the program with a delayed telecast on the next morning at 6:50AM from Tuesdays to Saturdays, replacing PTV's Teledyaryo as the Filipino news service on World Watch. It was later moved to 8:05AM timeslot from Tuesday to Saturday with replays at 2:30PM on SBS Viceland, while TV Patrol Weekend is shown every Sunday and Monday. It was replaced by TV Patrol when the newscast's production was suspended due to the enhanced community quarantine implemented to manage the COVID-19 pandemic in the Philippines and eventually cancelled.

Accolades
Bandilas coverage of the Subic rape case earned the news program a nomination for the Philippines in the International Emmy Awards spearheaded by the International Academy of Television Arts and Sciences.
Henry Omaga Diaz was awarded as one of the Ten Outstanding Media Personalities by International Media Associates Inc. (IMAI) on November 29, 2006.
Korina Sanchez was also included as one of the Most Well-Liked Female Personalities in the Anak TV Seal Awards 2006. In 2007, she was recognized in the same category but became number one among ten most well-liked female TV Personalities.
Bandila earned its first ever nomination for an International Emmy Award for their report "The Subic Rape Case Promulgation". It was the first time that an entry from the Philippines became a finalist on the award giving body. It became one of the four nominees in the News category out of the eight semi-finalists. Incidentally, TV Patrol, the network's primetime news program, was also chosen as one of the eight semi-finalists for the news category.
Bandila received a Golden Dove Award for Best News Program during the 16th KBP Golden Dove Awards. Kapisanan ng mga Brodkaster ng Pilipinas was established by the broadcast media practitioners to regulate the industry and elevate standards, promote social change, help disseminate government information, strengthen trade ties with the advertising industry, and promote the public welfare.
In 2007, Bandila won the Best News Program category in the 21st PMPC Star Awards for Television.
Bandila was hailed as the Best News Program during the 2007 Asian Television Awards, featuring their news coverage of the Subic Rape Case Promulgation
Bandila was awarded again with a Golden Dove Award for Best News Program during the 19th KBP (Kapisanan ng mga Brodkaster ng Pilipinas) Golden Dove Awards last November 2010.
Henry Omaga-Diaz was awarded with a Golden Dove Award as the "Best TV newscaster" during the 19th KBP Golden Dove Awards last November 2010.
Bandila won the categories for Best News Program and Best Male News Program Anchors (Julius Babao) at the 10th Gawad Tanglaw Awards (2012)

References

External links

ABS-CBN News and Current Affairs shows
ABS-CBN news shows
Philippine television news shows
2006 Philippine television series debuts
2020 Philippine television series endings
2010s Philippine television series
2020s Philippine television series
Filipino-language television shows
Television productions cancelled due to the COVID-19 pandemic